Ganyu District is under the administration of Lianyungang, Jiangsu province, China. It contains the province's northernmost point and is located along the Yellow Sea coast where the coastline takes a sharp turn toward the southeast, and borders the Shandong prefecture-level cities of Linyi and Rizhao to the north.

Culture
Unlike the rest of Northern Jiangsu, the native locals of Ganyu speak Jiaoliao Mandarin which is also native to Eastern Shandong province and most of Liaodong peninsula, instead of Jianghuai Mandarin.

Demographics 
According to the Fifth National Population Census of the People's Republic of China, there are 49 nations in Ganyu. Among all the people, the Han population accounts for 99.8% and the ethnic minority population account for 0.2%.

Geography and climate
Ganyu has a humid subtropical climate (Köppen Cwa) influenced by the East Asian Monsoon. The winters are cold and quite dry, while the summers are hot, rainy, and humid.

Famous people 
Xu Fu(), Hou Yong()

Famous food 
Jianbing()

Administrative divisions
There are 18 towns in the district:

References

www.xzqh.org 

County-level divisions of Jiangsu
Lianyungang